Helga Ursula "Uschi" Glas (born 2 March 1944), sometimes credited as Ursula Glas, is a German actress in film, television and on stage, and a singer.

Biography 

Born in Landau an der Isar, Bavaria, Glas started appearing in films in 1965. Her breakthrough role was that of Barbara in the unconventional 1968 movie Go for It, Baby (Zur Sache, Schätzchen), which captured the spirit of the times in that it presented youthful protest against the German establishment and hinted at the loosening of morals in the wake of the sexual revolution. From then on, the tabloid press would refer to Glas frequently as Schätzchen.

In the late '60s and early '70s, Glas appeared in many slapstick movies, notably in three films of the seven-part series (1967–72)  (The Brats on the Front Bench Row). She made five comedy films opposite singer Roy Black.

In the 1980s and 1990s Glas concentrated on her television work, appearing in a succession of TV series tailored to her person, playing, among other characters, a veterinarian in Tierärztin Christine (1993), an energetic businesswoman in Anna Maria – Eine Frau geht ihren Weg (Anna Maria – A Woman Does it Her Way, 1995–1996), and the ideal teacher in Sylvia – Eine Klasse für sich (Sylvia – A Class of her Own, 1998–2000). She also appeared in many feature-length made-for-TV movies. In total, Glas appeared in more than 75 film and TV productions.

Glas was married to the film producer  from 1981 until their divorce in 2003; they had three children. In 2005, Glas married the business consultant Dieter Herrmann. She is now the step-mother to Sophie Hermann, a social media influencer and fashion designer who appears in the UK reality TV series Made in Chelsea.

In 2004, Glas published a memoir, Mit einem Lächeln (With a Smile).

Selected filmography 

 The Sinister Monk (1965)
 Winnetou and the Crossbreed (1966)
 The Monk with the Whip (1967)
  (1967)
 Go for It, Baby (1968)
 The Gorilla of Soho (1968)
 Zur Hölle mit den Paukern (1968)
 Always Trouble with the Teachers (1968)
  Help, I Love Twins (1969)
 We'll Take Care of the Teachers (1970)
  (1970)
 Die Feuerzangenbowle (1970)
  (1970)
  (1970)
 The Body in the Thames (1971)
 Black Beauty (1971)
 The Reverend Turns a Blind Eye (1971)
 Who Laughs Last, Laughs Best (1971)
 Holidays in Tyrol (1971)
 Seven Blood-Stained Orchids (1972)
 Don't Get Angry (1972)
 100 Fäuste und ein Vaterunser (1972)
 Trouble with Trixie (1972)
  (1972)
 Der Kommissar, episode "Ein Mädchen nachts auf der Straße" (1973, TV)
 Derrick, season 3, episode 3: "Angst" (1976, TV)
 Polizeiinspektion 1 (1977–1988, TV series)
 Waldrausch (1977)
  (1977, TV film)
 The Old Fox, episode "Ein Koffer" (1978, TV)
 Unsere schönsten Jahre (1983–1985, TV series)
  (1984)
 Zwei Münchner in Hamburg (1989–1993, TV series)
 Ein Schloß am Wörthersee (1991–1993, TV series)
 Veterinarian Christine (1993, TV film)
 Anna Maria – Eine Frau geht ihren Weg (1994–1997, TV series)
 Veterinarian Christine II: The Temptation (1995, TV film)
 Sylvia – Eine Klasse für sich (1998–2000, TV series)
 Zwei am großen See (2004–2006, TV series)
  (2011, TV film)
 Fack ju Göhte (2013)
 Fack ju Göhte 2 (2015)
 Fack ju Göhte 3 (2017)
 Club der einsamen Herzen (2019, TV film)

Awards 

Film industry awards
 Bravo Otto in Bronze: 1967, 1976
 Bravo Otto in Silver: 1974, 1977
 Bravo Otto in Gold: 1969, 1970, 1971, 1972 (twice), 1973
 Bambi: 1969, 1990
 Romy: 1990 (as a Popular Actress), 1992 and 1993 (as a Favoured Series Star)
 Goldene Kamera: 1984 (Best TV camera favourite female – 3rd place HÖRZU reader poll), 1990 (Most Popular Actress Series – 1st place HÖRZU reader poll), 1995 (Best Actress)
 Bavarian Television Award Honorary Award 1995
 Golden Gong 1997 and 1998

Other awards
 1992: Bavarian Order of Merit
 1997: Austrian Cross of Honour for Science and Art
 1998: Merit Cross 1st Class of the Federal Republic of Germany (Verdienstkreuz 1. Klasse)
 1999: 
 2005:  for her social commitment
 2008:

References

External links 

1944 births
Living people
People from Dingolfing-Landau
German film actresses
Recipients of the Austrian Cross of Honour for Science and Art
Officers Crosses of the Order of Merit of the Federal Republic of Germany
Recipients of the Bambi (prize)
German television actresses
20th-century German actresses
21st-century German actresses